Conchas Chinas is an affluent colonia directly south of Puerto Vallarta in the state of Jalisco, on the Pacific coast of Mexico. The term Conchas Chinas means "Chinese Shells" referring to the type of shell found only on the beaches of Conchas Chinas. Locals in Puerto Vallarta refer to Conchas Chinas as "The Hills" (as in 'the Beverly Hills of Puerto Vallarta'). There are many gated communities perched high on the mountainsides directly on the bay, with many million-dollar homes owned by internationally known celebrities and politicians.

Resorts in Conchas Chinas
Puerto Vallarta, and specifically Conchas Chinas, are resort destinations. The following resorts are located in Conchas Chinas:
Casa Aventura
Casa Isabel
Casa Mirador
Grand Miramar Club and Spa
Garza Blanca
Howard Johnson's Hotel
Hyatt Ziva
Lindo Mar
Playa Fiesta
Puerto Vallarta Beach Club

See also 

 Playa Conchas Chinas

Neighbourhoods in Mexico
Populated places in Jalisco
Puerto Vallarta